Akiko Hasegawa, née Uchida (内田暁子 Uchida Akiko, born November 30, 1985) is a Japanese volleyball player who plays for NEC Red Rockets.

Clubs
BunkyoGakuin Univ. High School → AoyamaGakuin Univ. → NEC Red Rockets (2008-)

National team
The 5th AVC Eastern Zonal Volleyball championships (2006)
 Universiade national team (2007)

References

External links
Red Rockets Officialsite

Japanese women's volleyball players
NEC Red Rockets players
Living people
1985 births
Beach volleyball players at the 2018 Asian Games
Asian Games competitors for Japan